Abhirao is a village development committee in Kapilvastu District in the Lumbini Zone of southern Nepal. At the time of the 1991 Nepal census it had a population of 4590 people living in 732 individual households. Under Abhirao VDC, it has Three villages: 1. Bhaiskunda, 2. Bharwaliya, 3. Mankhoriya.

References

Populated places in Kapilvastu District